Olgerdin is an Icelandic brewery and beverage company based in Reykjavík. Established on 17 April 1913, the oldest beer-producing factory in Iceland. Annually, it produces 45 million liters of beverages. The brewery is named for Egill Skallagrímsson, an early inhabitant of Iceland and main character of Egil's Saga.

History
The company was established on 17 April 1913 by Tómas Tómasson, who began production of a (1% alc/vol) beverage, malt extract. Today it's the oldest beer-producing factory in Iceland; and now it's also a wholesaler of food and beverages. At first, the operations of Ölgerðin Egill Skallagrímsson were based in two bedrooms in the basement of the Þórshamar house at Templarasund in Reykjavik, which Tómas had leased. Today, this house is owned by the Icelandic parliament (Althing). A year later, the company moved to the Thomsen house at Tryggvagata, and with this, the operating area grew significantly.

The scope of operations was not large at first. The brewing boiler was only 65 litres, and bottles were closed by pushing the cap onto the bottle with a flat palm and binding it with wire. During the first production year, Ölgerðin sold around 38 thousand litres, mostly malt extract and white beer. The light beer Egils Pilsner came to market in the same year, as the ban on alcohol was implemented in 1915, after which it was illegal to produce alcoholic beer with more than 2.25% alcohol content. Generally, brewmasters from Germany and Denmark were hired to oversee the beer production. The company also produces soft drinks (e.g. Egils Appelsín).

Tómas Tómasson went to Copenhagen in 1915 to learn brewing at the Bryggeriet Stjernen and then in Germany, where he spent the next two years. Returning home in 1917, he bought his first building on Njálsgata on the crossroads between Njálsgata, Frakkastigur and Grettisgata, which was later renamed "Ölgerðartorfan". The company was located there for much of the 20th century. In the years 1924–1928, both a brewery and a yeast cellar were in use there. He built up a comprehensive brewery, fermentation and bottling facility.

In 1926, Ölgerðin sold a million bottles in one year. In the same year, Danish King Christian X made an official visit to Iceland. Subsequently, Ölgerðin was given the right to call themselves the "royal brewery".

The production of Egils Pilsner began in 1916; while the company claimed 1917 on the bottle for years. The company was the first to receive an exemption for the production of alcoholic beer in Iceland during the war, when it produced the Polar Ale for the British occupation forces. From 1951, Ölgerðin produced the Polar Beer for the US military base in Keflavik and then Export Beer, which the general population called Egils strong. After the beer ban was lifted in 1989, the brewery's main product was Egils Gull.

The production of soda drinks began in 1930, and Ölgerðin bought the soda drink factories Síríus and Kaldá. Ölgerðin was made into a corporation two years later and was merged with Ölgerðin Þór hf., which had been operating for two years. Þór had built a brewery at Rauðarárstígur, but it was closed during the merger. In 1955, Egils Appelsín (orange soda) was introduced. Sigurður Sveinsson, an employee of Ölgerðin created a recipe that was immediately appreciated by locals and has since then surpassed all other such drinks.

After Tómas died in 1978, in his nineties, his sons, Jóhannes and Tómas Agnar ran Ölgerðin Egill Skallagrímsson for almost a quarter of a century. In 2000, they decided to sell the family's share, and an agreement was reached at the end of the year with Íslandsbanki-FBA and the investment company Gilding. There was a change in ownership in April 2002, when Lind ehf., a subsidiary of Danól ehf., bought Ölgerðin. The operations of Lind and Ölgerðin were merged in the beginning of  that year, and with this merger, the product availability of Ölgerðin increased substantially. In 2007, Októ Einarsson and Andri Þór Guðmundsson acquired Ölgerðin with Kaupthing bank, which later sold its shares to several bank executives.

Ölgerðin Egill Skallagrímsson produces 45 million litres of beverages every year, of which 10 million litres are brewed in the brewing boiler.

Awards
Egils Gull earned the "World’s Best Standard Lager" at the World Beer Awards 2011 and Bríó won the best German-style Pilsner at the 2012 World Beer Cup.

See also
 Egils Appelsín
 Beer in Iceland
 Prohibition in Iceland

References

 Dudley, Karla (2012). Retrieved from https://web.archive.org/web/20141023065310/http://tapsmagazine.com/in-this-issue/iceland/.

External links
 Olgerdin Egill Skallagrímsson
 RateBeer 

Beer in Iceland
Companies based in Reykjavík
Icelandic brands
Drink companies of Iceland